Iraqi literature or Mesopotamian literature dates back to Sumerian times, which constitutes the earliest known corpus of recorded literature, including the religious writings and other traditional stories maintained by the Sumerian civilization and largely preserved by the later Akkadian and Babylonian empire. Mesopotamian civilization flourished as a result of the mixture of these cultures and has been called Mesopotamian or Babylonian literature in allusion to the geographical territory that such cultures occupied in the Middle East between the banks of the Tigris and Euphrates rivers.

Ancient 

The Sumerian literature is unique due to the fact that the Sumerian language itself is unique in its kind because it does not belong to any known linguistic root. Its appearance began with symbols of the things denoting it, then it turned with time to the cuneiform line, and later spread during the third millennium BC. All of them were in Mesopotamia, but hey were affected by historical events, so they lost much of their importance, and became the language of religious rituals, after the Semitic Akkadian language overcame them. However, there are texts  that date back to after the advent of Christianity. The two languages coincided, and they coexisted for many decades, and written traces appeared in each of them. Including the Epic of Gilgamesh, which was originally classified in Sumerian and reached the Akkadian.

The Sumerians wrote many mythical and epic texts dealing with creation issues, the emergence of the world, the gods, descriptions of the heavens, and the lives of heroes in the wars that broke out between the nomads and the urbanites. They also deal with religious teachings, moral advice, astrology, legislation, and history. In this same line Akkadian literature also proceeded, so that the two languages converged, and sometimes they shared the same subject.

Abbasid 

In the beginning of the Islamic Golden Age, during the Abbasid period, in which Baghdad was the capital, the House of Wisdom in Baghdad, which was a public academy and intellectual center hosted numerous scholars and writers such as Al-Jahiz and Omar Khayyam. A number of stories in the One Thousand and One Nights feature the Abbasid caliph Harun al-Rashid. Al-Hariri of Basra was a notable literary figure of this period.

20th century 
Some of the most important figures of 20th century Iraqi literature are Maruf Rusafi and Daisy Al-Amir.

In the late 1970s, a period of economic upturn, prominent writers in Iraq were provided with an apartment and car by Saddam Hussein's government, and were guaranteed at least one publication per year. In exchange, literature was expected to express and galvanise support for the ruling Ba'ath Party. The Iran–Iraq War (1980-1988) fuelled a demand for patriotic literature, but also pushed a number of writers into opting for exile. According to Najem Wali, during this period, "[e]ven those who chose to quit writing saw themselves forced to write something that did not rile the dictator, because even silence was considered a crime."

From the late 1980s onwards, Iraqi exile literature developed with writers whose "rejection of dominant ideology and [whose] resistance to the wars in Iraq compelled them to formulate a 'brutally raw realism' characterized by a shocking sense of modernity".

Late 20th century Iraqi literature has been marked by writers such as Saadi Youssef, Fadhil Al-Azzawi, Mushin Al-Ramli, Salah Al-Hamdani, Abdul Rahman Majeed al-Rubaie and Sherko Fatah.

See also
 Iraqi writers
 Iraqi novels
 Assyro-Babylonian literature
 Sumerian literature
 Culture of Iraq

Sources